I'm Yours is the sixth studio album recorded by American singer Linda Clifford, released in 1980 on the RSO/Curtom label.

Chart performance
The album peaked at No. 47 on the R&B albums chart. It also reached No. 160 on the Billboard 200. The album features the singles "Red Light", which peaked at No. 1 on the Hot Dance/Disco chart, No. 41 on the Billboard Hot 100, and No. 40 on the Hot Soul Singles chart, "Shoot Your Best Shot", which charted at No. 1 on the Hot Dance/Disco chart and No. 43 on the Hot Soul Singles chart, and "I Had a Talk with My Man", which reached No. 53 on the Hot Soul Singles chart.

Track listing

Personnel
Ben Picone and the Atlanta Strings – strings
Skip Lane and the Atlanta Horns – horns
Travis Biggs, Jesse Butler, Isaac Hayes – keyboards
Emmett North, Jr., Kim Palumu – guitars
Derek Galbraith – bass
Daniel Zebulon – percussion
Willie Hall – drums
Diane Davis, Diane Evans, Pat Lewis, Rose Williams, Linda Clifford – backup vocals
Bill Purse – horn & string arranger

Charts

Singles

References

External links
 

1980 albums
Linda Clifford albums
Albums produced by Isaac Hayes
Albums produced by Gil Askey
RSO Records albums
Curtom Records albums